The House of Koxinga or the Zheng dynasty was the reigning family of the Kingdom of Tungning in Taiwan. They played a significant role in the history of East Asia and Southeast Asia, particularly in the seventeenth century.

Names 
In Chinese, the dynasty is referred to as:
The Zheng clan.
The House of Zheng in Taiwan
The Family of Koxinga

Overview 

Following the Qing conquest of the Kingdom of Tungning in 1683, the territory's last ruler, Zheng Keshuang, Prince of Yanping, who was a grandson of Koxinga, was taken to Beijing. The Kangxi Emperor granted Zheng a peerage title, that of Duke Hanjun, and inducted him and his descendants into the Plain Red Banner. The family remained in Beijing until 1911 when the Xinhai revolution broke out and the Qing dynasty's fell, after which they moved back to Anhai and Nan'an in southern Fujian, where they remain to this day.

Koxinga's other descendants had the hereditary title of 'Sia'. They are found both on mainland China and in Taiwan, while descendants of Koxinga's brother Shichizaemon live in Japan.

His descendants through one of his sons Zheng Kuan live in Taiwan. One of Koxinga's descendants on mainland China, Zheng Xiaoxuan 鄭曉嵐 the father of Zheng Chouyu 鄭愁予, fought against the Japanese in the Second Sino-Japanese War. Zheng Chouyu was born in Shandong in mainland China and called himself a "child of the resistance" against Japan and he became a refugee during the war, moving from place to place across China to avoid the Japanese. He moved to Taiwan in 1949 and focuses his work on building stronger ties between Taiwan and mainland China. Zheng Chouyu was born in mainland China, he identified as Chinese and he felt alienated after he was forced to move to Taiwan in 1949 which was previously under Japanese rule and felt strange and foreign to him.

Rulers of the Kingdom of Tungning 
The House of Koxinga produced five rulers of the Kingdom of Tungning, three as reigning monarchs and two as regents.

Genealogy

See also 
Kingdom of Tungning
Sia (title)

References 

 
Kingdom of Tungning
Ming dynasty people